Moutoa Gardens, also known as Pākaitore, is a park in the city of Whanganui, New Zealand. Named after the Battle of Moutoa Island in the Second Taranaki War, it contains a memorial to the battle inscribed "To the memory of the brave men who fell at Moutoa, 14 May 1864, in defence of law and order against fanaticism and barbarism." It also contained a statue of John Ballance, organiser of a volunteer cavalry troop in Tītokowaru's War and later Premier of New Zealand, but the statue was beheaded and a replacement installed outside the district council building. A number of items present in the park are registered by Heritage New Zealand.

History

Historically, Pākaitore was a traditional fishing settlement for hundreds of years and later became a marketplace. The area was considered a sanctuary where all tribes were equal and the police could not enter.  Between 1839 and 1848 the New Zealand Company purchased Wanganui lands on behalf of the crown from people and tribes who may have had little or no claim to it.

The park was occupied for 79 days in 1995 in protest over a Treaty of Waitangi claim, an action which split the town and the nation and garnered significant attention from police. Local iwi claim the site was the location of a pā and trading site, left to Māori in the 1848 sale of Wanganui. Leading up to the protest the statue of Ballance was beheaded; a replacement Ballance statue was commissioned in 2009 and placed outside the Wanganui District Council buildings.

Listed heritage items

Kemp Monument
The most prominent monument at Moutoa Gardens today honours Te Keepa Te Rangihiwinui , a Māori military commander and noted ally of the government forces during the New Zealand Wars. First known as Te Rangihiwinui and later as Major Kemp, he led the government allied Māori forces who defeated  the rebel Māori at Moutoa Island. The inscription on the plinth says the monument was erected by the people of New Zealand to honour the "high-born Maori chief, brave soldier and staunch ally of the New Zealand Government". Installed in 1911, the Kemp Monument is listed as Category I.

Ballance Memorial
The Ballance Memorial commemorates John Ballance, who was the organiser of a volunteer cavalry troop and from 1891 until his death in 1893 was premier of New Zealand. The Ballance Memorial was unveiled in 1898. After the statue was beheaded twice—in 1993 and in 1994—it was removed in 1995 and only the plinth remains. A replacement statue was erected in front of the district council office in 2007. The statue was added to the country's heritage register in 1982 and the plinth remains on the register as a Category II item.

Māori War Memorial
It was unveiled on Anzac Day in 1925. It is registered as a Category II structure.

Moutoa Monument 
The Moutoa Monument was built in 1865 and commemorates the Battle of Moutoa Island that was fought on 14 May 1864. It is registered as a Category II structure.

First School Memorial
A fountain was erected in Moutoa Gardens in 1900. It was later found that the fountain occupied the site of Whanganui's first school, which opened to cater for Māori children but was also attended by pākehā. The fountain is no longer operational and it was not recorded when the fountain was converted into a landscaped garden. It is registered as a Category II structure.

Standard chain mark
A standard chain mark is located in Moutoa Gardens. Following the abolition of the provincial government system, surveying was standardised in New Zealand in 1879 with a chain mark being installed in Wellington. The Whanganui chain mark was installed in the following year and may be the only unmodified chain mark that remains in New Zealand. The standard chain mark is registered as a Category I item.

References

Parks in New Zealand
Whanganui
History of Manawatū-Whanganui
Protected areas of Manawatū-Whanganui